Robiginitomaculum is a Gram-negative, chemoheterotrophic, strictly aerobic and non-motile genus of bacteria from the family of Hyphomonadaceae with one known species (Robiginitomaculum antarcticum).

References

Bacteria genera
Monotypic bacteria genera